Cape Ortegal Lighthouse is a lighthouse in the Province of A Coruña, Galicia, Spain. It was planned and approved in 1982 and completed in 1984.

See also

 List of lighthouses in Spain

External links
 Comisión de faros
 Autoridad Portuaria de Ferrol San Cibrao Information plaque next to the lighthouse

References

Lighthouses completed in 1984
Lighthouses in Galicia (Spain)
Buildings and structures in the Province of A Coruña
1984 establishments in Spain